The following lists events in the year 2023 in Guatemala.

Incumbents 

 President:Alejandro Giammattei
 Vice-President: Guillermo Castillo Reyes

Events 

Ongoing – COVID-19 pandemic in Guatemala

Predicted and scheduled events 
 25 June
2023 Guatemalan general election
2023 Guatemala City mayoral election

Sports 
 July 2022 - May 2023: 2022–23 Liga Nacional de Guatemala

Deaths 

 23 January - Álvaro Colom, 71, engineer and politician, president (2008–2012).

See also 

COVID-19 pandemic in North America
 2020s
 2020s in political history

References 

 
2020s in Guatemala
Years of the 21st century in Guatemala
Guatemala
Guatemala